Venezuela is a country in South America. The Venezuelan people comprise a combination of heritages, primarily Native American and European. The historically present Native American, Spanish colonists, and African slaves have all contributed to varying degrees. Later, waves of European groups (Italians, Spanish, Portuguese and Germans) migrated to Venezuela in the 20th century, influencing many aspects of Venezuelan life, including its culture, language, food, and music though small in number.

About 25% of the population is mestizo (mixed white and indigenous); Arabs make up 5% of the population, Africans 5% , mulatto/pardo people 40%, Amerindian people 3.5% and other races, mostly Asians, make up 1.5%.

Three Amerindian tribes located in the country are the Wayuu, located in the west, in Zulia State, and the Timoto-cuicas, also in the west, in Mérida State, in the Andes.

About 85% of the population live in urban areas in the northern portion of the country and currently resides in the urban conglomerations (Caracas, Maracay, Maracaibo, Valencia, etc.) that are concentrated in Venezuela's northern coastal mountain strip. Nearly half of Venezuela's geographic area lies south of the Orinoco River; however, this region contains only 5% of the Venezuelan population.

 estimate puts Venezuela's total population at  inhabitants. Additionally, over the past five years, Venezuelan society's general age structure has been trending towards the homologous structure found in Cuba, Western Europe, Japan, and other healthy and rapidly ageing societies. Notably, there has been a significant increase in the proportion and gross numbers of elderly Venezuelans (aged 65 and up), as well as a corresponding drop in the total fertility.

Population 

The proportion of children below the age of 15 in 2010 was 29.5%, 64.9% was between 15 and 65 years of age, while 5.6% was 65 years or older.

 Source:

Structure of the population 
Structure of the population (01.07.2011) (Data refer to projections based on the 2001 Population Census):

Structure of the population (01.07.2013) (Data refer to projections based on the 2001 Population Census):

Vital statistics 
Registration of vital events in Venezuela is not complete. The Population Department of the United Nations prepared the following estimates.

Births and deaths 
Births and deaths:

Other demographic statistics 
Demographic statistics according to the World Population Review in 2019.

 One birth every 53 seconds
 One death every 3 minutes
 One net migrant every 45 minutes
 Net gain of one person every 1 minute

Demographic statistics according to the CIA World Factbook, unless otherwise indicated.

Total population:
 28,644,603 (July 2020 est.)

Ethnic groups:

unspecified Spanish, Italian (13–16%), Portuguese (1.4%), Arab (5%), German (<0.1%), African (3.4%), indigenous peoples (2.7%)

Age structure:

 0-14 years: 25.66% (male 3,759,280/female 3,591,897)
 15–24 years: 16.14% (male 2,348,073/female 2,275,912)
 25–54 years:  41.26% (male 5,869,736/female 5,949,082)
 55–64 years:  8.76% (male 1,203,430/female 1,305,285)
 65 years and over:  8.18% (male 1,069,262/female 1,272,646) (2020 est.)

Median age:
 total: 30 years. Country comparison to the world: 124th
 male: 29.4 years
 female: 30.7 years (2020 est.)

Birth rate:
 17.9 births/1,000 population (2020 est.) Country comparison to the world: 92nd

Death rate:
 7.5 deaths/1,000 population (2020 est.) Country comparison to the world: 106th

Total fertility rate:
 2.26 children born/woman (2020 est.) Country comparison to the world: 87th

Net migration rate:
 -3.4 migrant(s)/1,000 population (2020 est.) Country comparison to the world: 184th

Population growth rate:
 -0.18% (2020 est.) Country comparison to the world: 207th
 1.51% (2009 est.).

Contraceptive prevalence rate:
 75% (2010)

Dependency ratios:
 total dependency ratio: 52.6 (2015 est.)
 youth dependency ratio: 43 (2015 est.)
 elderly dependency ratio: 9.5 (2015 est.)
 potential support ratio: 10.5 (2015 est.)

Life expectancy at birth:

 total population: 76.2 years
 male: 73.2 years
 female: 79.3 years (2018 est.)

Urbanization:
 urban population: 88.2% of total population (2018)
 rate of urbanisation: 1.28% annual rate of change (2015–20 est.)

Languages:

Spanish (official), numerous indigenous dialects

Literacy:

definition: age 15 and over can read and write (2016 est.)

 total population: 97.1%
 male: 97%
 female: 97.2% (2016 est.)

School life expectancy (primary to tertiary education):
 total: 14 years

Unemployment, youth ages 15–24:
 total: 14.6%. Country comparison to the world: 92nd

Sex ratio

Race 
According to an autosomal DNA genetic study conducted in 2008 by the University of Brasilia (UNB), the composition of Venezuela's population is: 60.60% of European contribution, 23% of Amerindian contribution and 16.30% of African contribution. 3.6% of Venezuelans are fully black, but Mulattos (black mixed with white) are a much larger proportion, with many Venezuelans having African ancestry.

Religious affiliation 
The overwhelming majority of Venezuelans denote themselves as adherents of Catholicism; this is true nominally, if not in practice.

According to the 2011 census, 88.3 per cent of the population is Christian, primarily Roman Catholic (71%), 17 per cent Protestant, and the remaining 0.03 per cent Mormons (LDS Church). The Venezuelans without religion are 9% (atheist 2%, agnostic or indifferent 6% and doesn't know/doesn't respond 1% ), almost 3% of the population follow other religions (1% of them are of Santería).

Notes

References 
 
 Acosta, Maruja. "Urbanizacion y clases sociales en Venezuela." Revista Interamericana de Planificacion Bogota, 7, No. 26, June 1973, 22–44.
 The article contains a statistical reference from the Wikipedia public domain Mestizos (2006).

External links 

 Ethnic Map of Venezuela by census

 
Venezuela